is a town located in Kamo District, Shizuoka Prefecture, Japan. ,  the town had an estimated population of 7,798 in 3764 households, and a population density of 74 persons per km².

Geography
Sandwiched between the Amagi Mountains to the east and Suruga Bay on the Pacific Ocean to the west, Nishiizu has a hill hinterland and a rocky, indented ria coast. The area has numerous hot springs. Warmed by the warm Kuroshio Current, the area enjoys a warm maritime climate with hot, humid summers and mild, cool winters. Parts of the town are within the borders of Fuji-Hakone-Izu National Park,

Neighboring municipalities
Shizuoka Prefecture
Izu
Kawazu
Matsuzaki

Demographics
Per Japanese census data, the population of Nishiizu has been in decline over the past 60 years.

Climate
The city has a climate characterized by hot and humid summers, and relatively mild winters (Köppen climate classification Cfa).  The average annual temperature in Nishiizu is 13.6 °C. The average annual rainfall is 2248 mm with September as the wettest month. The temperatures are highest on average in August, at around 24.0 °C, and lowest in January, at around 3.9 °C.

History
During the Edo period, all of Izu Province was tenryō territory under direct control of the Tokugawa shogunate, and the area now comprising Nishiizu consisted of seven villages within ancient Naka District. With the establishment of the modern municipality system of the early Meiji period in 1889, the area was reorganized into three villages (Nishina, Tago, and Ugusu), which became part of Kamo District from 1896. A fourth village, Arari, was created out of Ugusu the same year.

The town of Nishiizu was founded on March 31, 1956 through the merger of the villages of Tago and Nishina and in September of the same year, the villages of Ugusu and Arari were rejoined to form Kamo. Kamo was merged into Nishiizu on April 1, 2005.

Economy
The economy of Nishiizu is dominated by tourism centered on hot spring resorts, and by commercial fishing.

Education
Nishiizu has three public elementary schools and two public junior high schools operated by the town government. The town does not have a high school.

Transportation

Railway
Nishiizu does not have any passenger railway service

Highway

References

External links

Towns in Shizuoka Prefecture
Populated coastal places in Japan
Nishiizu, Shizuoka